Dhanmalhi is a 1993 Maldivian teledrama directed by Reeko Moosa Manik. Produced and distributed by Television Maldives, the film stars Reeko Moosa Manik, Lilian Saeed and Suneetha in pivotal roles. The film shows the conflict between a husband and wife and the progression of the husband due to his wife's behavior.

Premise
Idhrees (Reeko Moosa Manik) is married to an indolent, deceptive and manipulative wife, Faree (Lilian Saeed) who does no work other than sleep and watching television citing her ill-health.  Idhrees, who is treated as a servant to Faree gets his final warning at his job for being continuously late to work. Hussainfulhu (Koyya Hassan Manik), a well wisher for Idhrees, advises him to take control of his life. Meanwhile, a colleague of Idhrees, Hafsa (Suneetha) shows interest towards him while his wife suspects him having an affair with another woman.

Cast 
 Reeko Moosa Manik as Idhrees
 Lilian Saeed as Fareedha
 Suneetha as Hafsa
 Koyya Hassan Manik as Hussainfulhu
 Arifa Ibrahim as Fareedha's mother
 Shakir as Solih

Soundtrack

Reception 
Upon release, the film mainly received mixed to positive reviews from critics. It was lauded for demonstrating the classical regressive view from a female's perspective unlike other locals releases and also for the performance of Reeko Moosa Manik and Lilian Saeed. Similarly, another critic applauded the cinematographer and director's work in utilizing the locations as a "transitioning point" in the film, however criticized the film makers conception of a healthy marriage.

References

External links 
 

1993 television films
1993 films
Maldivian television films